El Aguacate Airport  is an airport serving the city of Catacamas in Olancho Department, Honduras.

The runway has an additional  of paved overrun on the western end.

See also

 List of airports in Honduras
 Transport in Honduras

References

External links
 LaPrensa Honduras First flight from Catacamas to Toncontin, 15 Aug 2013
 OpenStreetMap - El Aguacate
 OurAirports - El Aguacate
 El Aguacate
 Skyvector Aeronautical Charts - El Aguacate

Airports in Honduras